Bruce Scott (born 16 August 1969) is a Jamaican-born British former professional boxer who competed from 1991 to 2009. He challenged twice for cruiserweight world championships in 1999; the WBO and WBC titles. At regional level, he held the British and Commonwealth cruiserweight titles twice between 1998 and 2001.

References

External links

Image - Bruce Scott

1969 births
Cruiserweight boxers
Jamaican male boxers
Light-heavyweight boxers
Living people
Boxers from Greater London
British male boxers